Mount Ephraim can refer to:
 Mount Ephraim, the historical name for a district in Israel
 Mount Ephraim, Ohio, an unincorporated community in Noble County, Ohio, United States
 Mount Ephraim, Massachusetts, former name for Richmond, Berkshire County, Massachusetts, United States before it was incorporated in 1765
 Mount Ephraim, New Jersey, a borough in Camden County, New Jersey, United States
 Mount Ephraim (Vermont), a mountain in Springfield, Vermont, United States
 Mount Ephraim Gardens, historic house and gardens, near Faversham, United Kingdom
 Mount Ephraim, Streatham Hill, London, a narrow approach of two streets with gardens on the western flank of the Norwood Ridge